The Victorian Aboriginal Child Care Agency or VACCA is an organisation in Victoria, founded by Aboriginal Australians in the 1970s, to provide services to and advocacy for Aboriginal Australians and Torres Strait Islanders. It was also known as the Aboriginal Child Placement Agency (ACPA).  The Victorian Aboriginal Child Care Agency (VACCA) promotes a culturally respectful and culturally appropriate approach to Indigenous children and families. VACCA played an important role in bringing to light the full extent of the horrors of the Stolen Generations.

History
The Victorian Aboriginal Child Care Agency (VACCA) was established in 1976 after discussions at a national adoption conference held that year. In particular, Mollie Dyer's contribution to the conference and increasing pressure from the Victorian Aboriginal Legal Service which saw the link between child removal from Indigenous families and over-representation in the criminal justice system.

The Victorian Aboriginal Child Care Agency became a model for other Aboriginal and Islander Child Care Agencies nationwide and spent time networking with activists in other states to ensure the success of the other agencies.

Out of the state-based agencies, and as a result of the 'First Aboriginal Child Survival Seminar' held in Melbourne in 1979, the Secretariat of National Aboriginal and Islander Child Care (SNAICC) was established in 1981 as a national non-government body representing the interests of Aboriginal and Torres Strait Islander children and families.

References

Further reading
Libesman, Terri. Decolonizing Indigenous Child Welfare: Comparative Perspectives. Routledge, 2013.
Victorian Aboriginal Child Care Agency. "The Aboriginal Cultural Competence Framework." (2008).
 Long, Maureen, and Rene Sephton. "Rethinking the “best interests” of the child: Voices from Aboriginal child and family welfare practitioners." Australian Social Work 64.1 (2011): 96-112.

External links 

 

Indigenous Australian politics
1976 establishments in Australia
Organizations established in 1976
Organisations based in Melbourne